Zen Judaism: For You a Little Enlightenment (Harmony Books, 2002) is a humor book by David M. Bader, the author of Haikus for Jews: For You a Little Wisdom (1999) and Haiku U.: From Aristotle to Zola, Great Books in 17 Syllables (Gotham Books, 2004).

Widely circulated in e-mails and quoted on web pages, often without attribution, this collection of  Jewish Zen combines Eastern wisdom and advice with Jewish kvetching.

The following are examples:

The Journey of a thousand miles begins with a single "Oy."
There is no escaping karma. In a previous life, you never called, you never wrote, you never visited. And whose fault was that?
To know the Buddha is the highest attainment. Second highest is to go to the same doctor as the Buddha.

References

2002 non-fiction books
Comedy books
Jewish comedy and humor
Buddhism and Judaism